The Cordish Companies (previously The Cordish Company) is a U.S.-based real estate development and entertainment operating company with its headquarters on the 6th floor of the Pratt Street Power Plant in Baltimore, Maryland. It was founded in 1910 by Louis Cordish.

In 1933, his son Paul L. Cordish joined the business. Then in 1968, Paul’s son David S. Cordish joined the firm and currently serves as its chairman and CEO. As of 2014, all three of David’s sons, Jonathan, Blake, and Reed Cordish, served as Vice Presidents of The Cordish Companies with responsibilities over Private Equity Holdings, Real Estate Development and Entertainment Management divisions.

The Cordish Companies has experience in the following disciplines of real estate: Commercial Real Estate, Coworking Spaces, Entertainment Districts, Gaming, Hotels, International Development, Private Equity, Residential, Restaurants and Sports-Anchored Districts. The Cordish Companies has been awarded seven ULI Awards for Excellence for positively impacting the cities in which they develop.

Investments
Notable properties developed, or under development, by the company are as follows:

 Saint Louis Ballpark Village (St. Louis, MO)
 Bayou Place & Bayou Place Offices (Houston, TX)
 Charleston Place (Charleston, SC)
 Fourth Street Live! (Louisville, KY)
 Jacksonville Shipyards (Jacksonville, FL)
 Kansas City Live!
 Live! at the Battery (Atlanta, GA)
 Live! by Loews - Arlington, TX (Arlington, TX)
 Live! by Loews - St. Louis, MO (St. Louis, MO)
 Live! Casino & Hotel Maryland (Baltimore/Washington, DC)
 Live! Casino & Hotel Philadelphia
 Live! Casino Pittsburgh (Greensburg, PA)
 One Cardinal Way (St. Louis, MO)
 One Light Luxury Apartments (Kansas City, MO)
 Pattison Place (Philadelphia, PA)
 Power & Light District (Kansas City, MO)
 Power Plant & Pier IV (Baltimore, MD)
 Power Plant Live! (Baltimore, MD)
 Seminole Hard Rock Hotel & Casino (Hollywood, FL / Tampa, FL)
 Spark Baltimore (Baltimore, MD)
 Spark KC (Kansas City, MO)
 Texas Live! (Arlington, TX)
 Two Light Luxury Apartments (Kansas City, MO)
 Waterside District (Norfolk, VA)
 Xfinity Live! (Philadelphia, PA)

History
The company dates to 1910, when Louis Cordish began developing real estate in the Baltimore–Washington metropolitan area.

In 1935, his son Paul L. Cordish joined the business; in 1968, Paul’s son David S. Cordish joined the firm.

In 1968, David S. Cordish assumed leadership of the company.

In 1982, the Gaming and Hotel divisions were formed.

In 1994, the Entertainment Management division of the company was formed.

In 1999, the company opened the first Live! district, Power Plant Live!.

In 2004, the company reached developed the Seminole Hard Rock Hotel & Casino Tampa and the Seminole Hard Rock Hotel & Casino Hollywood.

In 2005, the company formed the Sports-Anchored District division.

In 2010, the company launched its International Development division.

In 2020, the company launched a brand new online gambling business called Playlive!

References

 
Shopping center management firms
Real estate companies of the United States
Companies based in Baltimore
American companies established in 1910
1910 establishments in the United States
Cordish family